Lieutenant-Colonel Charles Somerville MacAlester of Loup and Kennox (1797–1891) was a son of Charles MacAlester and Janet Somerville. He was born in Scotland in 1797 and was a chief of Clan MacAlister.

Biography

Born 15 September 1797, the eldest son of Charles MacAlester and Janet Somerville, daughter of William Somerville of Kennox and Lilian Porterfield, daughter of Gabriel Porterfield of Hapland.

Charles married Mary Adeline Brabazon Lyon, a daughter of Captain Edward Lyon and Anna Catherine Wynstanley, in January 1828. He became Deputy Lieutenant of Ayrshire, a Justice of the Peace of Ayrshire and gained the rank of Lieutenant-Colonel in the service of the Ayr and Wigton Militia.

In 1846 Charles MacAlester of Loup and Kennox, was granted the right to take up Arms as Chief of Clan MacAlister, by the Lyon Court.

He died on 6 January 1891 and is buried in Warriston Cemetery. The plain granite monument lies to the north of the vaults but has been vandalised (2016). He was succeeded as Chief of Clan MacAlister by his son Charles.

Family

Charles and Mary had five children.

Charles MacAlester b. 18 Mar 1830, d. 17 Jan 1903
Edward MacAlester
Anna Catharine MacAlester
Jessy MacAlester
Mary MacAlester d. 1894

References

Charles
1797 births
1891 deaths